Flatley is a surname. Notable people with the surname include:

 Bert Flatley (1919–1987), English soccer player and manager
 Elton Flatley (born 1977), Australian rugby union player
 James H. Flatley (1906–1958), American vice admiral, naval aviator and tactician
 James H. Flatley III, a rear admiral in the United States Navy
 Michael Flatley (born 1958), American step dancer, writer, flautist and choreographer
 Patricia Flatley Brennan, American nurse and academic
 Patrick Flatley (born 1963), Canadian ice hockey player
 Paul Flatley (born 1941), American NFL player
 Stavros Flatley, finalist on Britain's Got Talent (series 3)
 Thomas Flatley (died 2008), Irish-American real estate tycoon and philanthropist

See also 
 , Oliver Hazard Perry-class guided-missile frigate, named after Vice Admiral James H. Flatley

English-language surnames